The following is a list of ministerial offices in the Government of the United Kingdom. The highest ranking ministers are Cabinet ministers or also attend Cabinet.

Prime Minister's Office 
 Prime Minister
First Lord of the Treasury
First Secretary of State
Minister for the Civil Service
Minister for the Union
Parliamentary Private Secretary to the Prime Minister
 Deputy Prime Minister

Former positions

Deputy Prime Minister's Office 

 Minister Assisting the Deputy Prime Minister (joint with Cabinet Office)

Cabinet Office

Cabinet Office 
 Minister for the Cabinet Office
 Chancellor of the Duchy of Lancaster
 President of the COP26 Climate Change Conference
 Minister without Portfolio
 Paymaster General (joint with HM Treasury)
Minister of State at the Cabinet Office
 Minister of State for the Constitution and Devolution (Minister of State at the Cabinet Office)
 Minister of State for Efficiency and Transformation (Minister of State at the Cabinet Office) (joint with HM Treasury)
Minister of State for EU Relations (Minister of State at the Cabinet Office)
 Parliamentary Under Secretary of State for Defence People and Veterans (joint with Ministry of Defence)

Government Equalities Office 

 Minister for Equalities
 Parliamentary Under-Secretary of State for Equalities
 Parliamentary Under Secretary of State for Women

Former positions

Cabinet Office 
 Minister of State at the Office of Public Service
Minister for the Northern Powerhouse and Local Growth
 Minister of State for Government Policy
Minister of State for the Third Sector
Minister for Digital Engagement and Civil Service Issues
Minister Assisting the Deputy Prime Minister (joint with Deputy Prime Minister's Office)
Parliamentary Secretary for Implementation
Minister for Social Exclusion

Government Equalities Office 

 Minister for Women and Equalities
Deputy Minister for Women (Second Blair ministry)

Defence ministers 

 Secretary of State for Defence
 Minister of State for Defence Procurement
 Minister of State for Defence
 Parliamentary Under-Secretary of State for Defence People and Veterans
 Parliamentary Under-Secretary of State for the Armed Forces

Former positions 

Secretary of State for Air
Secretary of State for War and the Colonies
First Lord of the Admiralty
Treasurer of the Navy

Ministry of Defence 

 Minister of Defence for the Royal Navy
 Minister of State for Defence Equipment and Support
Minister of Defence for Equipment
Minister of State for Strategic Defence Acquisition Reform
Minister of State for International Defence and Security
Parliamentary Under-Secretary of State for International Security Strategy
Parliamentary Under-Secretary of State for Reserves

National Government/War Cabinet Ministers 

 Minister of War Production
 Minister of Aircraft Production
 Minister of Supply
 Minister-Resident for the Middle East
 Minister of Reconstruction (also WW1)
 Minister of Munitions
 Minister of Defence
Minister for Co-ordination of Defence
 Parliamentary Secretary to the Ministry of Munitions
Parliamentary and Financial Secretary to the Ministry of Munitions

War Office 

 Secretary of State for War
 Secretary at War (occasionally Cabinet position)
 Under-Secretary of State for War
 Financial Secretary to the War Office
 Paymaster-General of the Forces

HM Treasury ministers 
 Chancellor of the Exchequer
Second Lord of the Treasury
Chief Secretary to the Treasury
Paymaster General (joint with the Cabinet Office)
 Financial Secretary to the Treasury
 Economic Secretary to the Treasury (City Minister)
 Exchequer Secretary to the Treasury
Minister of State for Efficiency and Transformation (Minister of State for the Treasury) (joint with the Cabinet Office)

Former positions 

Commercial Secretary to the Treasury
Financial Services Secretary to the Treasury (City Minister)
Minister of State for Revenue Protection at the Border (Minister of State for the Treasury)
Minister of State for Trade and Competitiveness in Europe (joint with Trade and Industry)

Department of Economic Affairs 

 Secretary of State for Economic Affairs
 Minister of State for Economic Affairs
 Under-Secretary of State for Economic Affairs

Foreign Affairs ministers 

 Secretary of State for Foreign, Commonwealth and Development Affairs
 Minister of State for Middle East and North Africa
 Minister of State for Pacific and the Environment (joint with DEFRA)
 Minister of State for Asia
 Minister of State for South Asia and the Commonwealth
 Parliamentary Under-Secretary of State for Africa
 Parliamentary Under-Secretary of State for European Neighbourhood and the Americas
 Parliamentary Under-Secretary of State for Overseas Territories and Sustainable Development

Former positions 

 Secretary of State for Foreign and Commonwealth Affairs
 Secretary of State for the Northern Department
 Secretary of State for the Colonies
 Secretary of State for Commonwealth Affairs
 Secretary of State for Commonwealth Relations
Secretary of State for Dominion Affairs
Deputy Secretary of State for Foreign Affairs (Heath) 
 Minister of State for International Energy Strategy
 Minister of State for the Middle East
 Minister of State for Commonwealth Affairs
 Minister of State for Commonwealth Relations
 Minister of State for Foreign Affairs
 Minister of State for Foreign and Commonwealth Affairs
 Parliamentary Under-Secretary of State for Asia and the Pacific
 Parliamentary Under-Secretary of State for the Colonies
 Under-Secretary of State for the Colonies
 Under-Secretary of State for the Northern Department

India Office and Burma Office 

 Secretary of State for India
 President of the Board of Control
 Secretary of State for India and Burma
 Secretary of State for Burma

Department for Exiting the European Union 

 Secretary of State for Exiting the European Union
 Minister of State for Exiting the European Union
 Parliamentary Under-Secretary of State for Exiting the European Union

Department for International Development 
 Secretary of State for International Development
Minister of State for International Development
Parliamentary Under-Secretary of State for Syrian Refugees (joint with Communities and Home Office)

Justice ministers

Ministry of Justice 
Secretary of State for Justice
 Lord Chancellor
 Minister of State for Crime, Policing and the Fire Service (joint with the Home Office)
 Minister of State for Prisons and Probations
 Parliamentary Under-Secretary of State for Justice
 Parliamentary Under Secretary of State for Immigration Compliance and the Courts (joint with the Home Office)

Former positions

Ministry of Justice 
 Minister of State for Prisons
Minister of State for Civil Justice and Legal Policy
Minister for Young Citizens and Youth Engagement (joint with Education)
 Parliamentary Under-Secretary of State for Prisons and Youth Justice
Parliamentary Under-Secretary of State for Human Rights

Department for Constitutional Affairs 

 Secretary of State for Constitutional Affairs
Parliamentary Under-Secretary of State for Constitutional Affairs

Lord Chancellor's Department 

 Minister of State for the Lord Chancellor's Department
 Parliamentary Under-Secretary for the Lord Chancellor's Department

Home affairs ministers

Home Office 
Secretary of State for the Home Department
 Deputy Home Secretary
 Minister of State for Security
 Minister of State for Crime, Policing and the Fire Service (joint with Justice)
 Minister of State for Countering Extremism (joint with GEO)
 Minister of State for Building Safety and Communities (joint with Communities)
 Parliamentary Under-Secretary of State for Crime, Safeguarding and Vulnerability 
 Parliamentary Under-Secretary of State for Immigration and Future Borders
 Parliamentary Under-Secretary of State for Immigration Compliance and Courts (joint with Justice)

Former positions

Home Office 
 Minister of State for Asylum and Immigration
 Minister of State for Home Affairs
Minister of State for Security and Economic Crime
Minister of State for Modern Slavery and Organised Crime
Minister of State for Security and Counter-Terrorism
Parliamentary Under-Secretary of State for Syrian Refugees (joint with Communities and International Development)

Health ministers

Department of Health and Social Care 
Secretary of State for Health and Social Care
Minister of State for Health
Minister of State for Care
Minister of State for Mental Health, Suicide Prevention and Patient Safety
Parliamentary Under-Secretary of State for Prevention, Public Health and Primary Care
Parliamentary Under-Secretary of State for COVID-19 Vaccine Deployment
Parliamentary Under-Secretary of State for Innovation

Former positions

Department of Health 

 Secretary of State for Health
 Parliamentary Under-Secretary of State for Quality

Business and trade ministers 
Department for Business, Energy and Industrial Strategy
Secretary of State for Business, Energy and Industrial Strategy
Minister of State for Business, Energy and Clean Growth
Minister of State for Universities, Science, Research and Innovation
Minister of State for Investment (joint with DfIT)
Parliamentary Under-Secretary of State for Small Business, Consumers and Labour Markets
Parliamentary Under-Secretary of State for Business and Industry
Parliamentary Under Secretary of State for Science, Research and Innovation
Parliamentary Under-Secretary of State for Climate Change and Corporate Responsibility

Department for International Trade 
 Secretary of State for International Trade
President of the Board of Trade
Minister of State for Trade Policy
Minister of State for Investment
Parliamentary Under-Secretary of State for Exports
Parliamentary Under-Secretary of State for International Trade

Former positions

Department for Business, Energy and Industrial Strategy 

 Minister of State for Decentralisation and Planning
 Parliamentary Under-Secretary of State for Small Business, Consumers and Corporate Responsibility
 Parliamentary Under-Secretary of State for Climate Change

Department for Business, Enterprise and Regulatory Reform

Department for Business, Innovation and Skills 

 Secretary of State for Business, Innovation and Skills

Department of Trade and Industry 

 Secretary of State for Trade and Industry
 Minister of State for Trade and Industry

Ministry of Technology 

 Minister of Technology
 Minister of State for Technology
 Parliamentary Secretary to the Ministry of Technology

Education ministers

Department for Education (2010-present) 
Secretary of State for Education
Minister of State for School Standards
Minister of State for Universities
Parliamentary Under-Secretary of State for Children and Families
Parliamentary Under-Secretary of State for Apprenticeships and Skills
Parliamentary Under-Secretary of State for the School System

Former positions

Department for Education (2010-present) 

 Parliamentary Under-Secretary of State for 14-19 Reform and Apprenticeships

Department for Children, Schools and Families (2007-2010) 

 Secretary of State for Children, Schools and Families
 Minister for Young Citizens and Youth Engagement (joint with Justice)

Department for Education and Skills (2001-2007) 

 Secretary of State for Education and Skills

Work and Pensions ministers

Department for Work and Pensions 

 Secretary of State for Work and Pensions
Minister of State for Disabled People, Health and Work
Parliamentary Under-Secretary of State for Pensions and Financial Inclusion
Parliamentary Under-Secretary of State for Welfare Delivery
Parliamentary Under-Secretary of State for Employment
Parliamentary Under-Secretary of State for Work and Pensions

Former positions

Department of Social Security 

 Secretary of State for Social Security
Parliamentary Under-Secretary of State for Social Security

Department for Work and Pensions 

 Minister of State for Pensions and Child Maintenance
 Minister of State for Welfare Reform

Environment ministers

Department for Environment, Food and Rural Affairs 
 Secretary of State for Environment, Food and Rural Affairs
Minister of State for Pacific and the Environment (joint with FCDO)
Parliamentary Under-Secretary of State for Agriculture, Fisheries and Food
Parliamentary Under-Secretary of State for Environment and Rural Opportunities
Parliamentary Under-Secretary of State for Rural Affairs and Biosecurity

Former positions 

 Minister of State for Environment and Countryside

Transport ministers

Department for Transport 
 Secretary of State for Transport
Minister of State for Transport
Minister of State for Railways
Minister of State for High Speed 2
Parliamentary Under-Secretary of State for Transport
Parliamentary Under-Secretary of State for Roads and Light Rail
Parliamentary Under-Secretary of State for Aviation and Maritime
Parliamentary Under-Secretary of State for Future of Transport

Former positions 

 Minister for Public Transport
 Minister for Railways and Roads
 Under-Secretary of State for Transport

Local and devolved government

Welsh Office 

 Secretary of State for Wales
 Parliamentary Under-Secretary of State for Wales

Scotland Office 

 Secretary of State for Scotland
Parliamentary Under-Secretary of State for Scotland

Northern Ireland Office 

 Secretary of State for Northern Ireland
Minister of State for Northern Ireland

Ministry of Housing, Communities and Local Government 

 Secretary of State for Housing, Communities and Local Government
Minister of State for Housing
Minister of State for Regional Growth and Local Government
Minister of State for London
Minister of State for Building Safety and Communities
Parliamentary Under-Secretary of State for Rough Sleeping and Housing

Former positions

Ministry of Housing, Communities and Local Government 
Minister of State for the Northern Powerhouse and Local Growth (joint with Cabinet Office)
Minister of State for Portsmouth
Minister of State for Communities and Resilience
Parliamentary Under-Secretary of State for Faith and Communities
Parliamentary Under-Secretary of State for Syrian Refugees (joint with International Development and Home Office)

Culture and media ministers

Department for Digital, Culture, Media and Sport 

 Secretary of State for Digital, Culture, Media and Sport
Minister of State for Digital and Culture
Minister of State for Media and Data
 Parliamentary Under-Secretary of State for Digital Infrastructure
Parliamentary Under Secretary of State, Minister for Sport, Tourism and Heritage
Parliamentary Under-Secretary of State for Civil Society and Digital, Media Culture and Sport

Former positions 

 Secretary of State for National Heritage

Department for Digital, Culture, Media and Sport 

 Minister of State for Sport, Media and Creative Industries
 Parliamentary Under-Secretary of State for Arts, Heritage and Tourism
 Parliamentary Under-Secretary of State for Digital and Broadband
Minister of State for Communications (joint with Business)
Minister of State for the Millennium

Post Office 

 Postmaster General of the United Kingdom

Secretaries of State

Parliamentary leadership

House of Commons 
Leader of the House of Commons
Deputy Leader of the House of Commons

House of Lords 
Leader of the House of Lords
Deputy Leader of the House of Lords

Whips

House of Commons 
Parliamentary Secretary to the Treasury (Chief Whip)
Treasurer of His Majesty’s Household (Deputy Chief Whip)
Comptroller of His Majesty’s Household
Vice-Chamberlain of His Majesty’s Household
Junior Lord of the Treasury/Lords Commissioners of the Treasury
Assistant Government Whip

House of Lords 

 Captain of the Honourable Corps of Gentlemen at Arms (Chief Whip)
 Captain of the Queen's Bodyguard of the Yeoman of the Guard (Deputy Chief Whip)
Baronesses and Lords in waiting (Lords Whips)

Law officers 
 Attorney General for England and Wales
 Advocate General for Scotland
Advocate General for Northern Ireland
 Solicitor General for England and Wales

Former positions 

 Attorney-General for Ireland
 Solicitor-General for Ireland

Sinecures
Lord President of the Council
Lord Keeper of the Privy Seal

Notes

References

External links 
 www.gov.uk/government/ministers
 House of Commons Disqualification Act 1975, sch 2
 Ministerial and other Salaries Act 1975, sch 1

Politics of the United Kingdom
Lists of government ministers of the United Kingdom
Ministerial offices in the United Kingdom